Hernán Yury Condori Machado  (born 22 December 1966) is a Peruvian doctor and former Minister of Health of Peru.

References

Living people
1966 births
Federico Villarreal National University alumni
Government ministers of Peru
Peruvian Ministers of Health
21st-century Peruvian politicians